The Sunnen Foundation is a charitable foundation which was established by machinery manufacturer Joseph Sunnen in 1953.  The foundation is managed by a board of trustees made up of Sunnen family members and company employees.  Michael Haughey is president and Matt Kreider is chairman of Sunnen Products, and Sunnen Foundation assets were estimated in 2007 to be valued at $16 million.  The foundation makes 10 to 20 grants a year, totaling over $600,000. The Foundation is financed by earnings on investments rather than by company money. 

Joe Sunnen established his Maplewood-based firm in 1924.  It has been involved in a number of charitable projects, including the transformation of the Ozarks' YMCA in 1946, and has awarded grants to various groups throughout the United States such as its approximately $75,000-$100,000 yearly grant to Catholics for a Free Choice to fund their Abortion in Good Faith series, which totaled $1,091,700 to 1995.  Grants are usually awarded to organizations in the St. Louis region, with about $250,000 a year going to groups in the Maplewood-Richmond Heights area.  The foundation has been particularly generous to the YMCA, and is strongly committed to funding projects that promote First Amendment rights, reproductive rights and youth services, such as the Missouri Religious Coalition for Reproductive Choice.

Other organizations that have received support include the Children's Advocacy Center, Child Support Network, the Missouri Botanical Garden, Operation Food Search, World Bird Sanctuary, Planned Parenthood, Epworth Children and Family Services, College for Living, Our Little Haven and Voices for Children.

References
 St. Louis Business Journal: Sunnen Foundation transformed YMCA of the Ozarks June 26, 1998, by Allyson Mccollum
 Voices for Children: Who Supports VFC?

Sunnen Foundation
Sunnen Foundation
Foundations based in the United States